Haunani-Kay Trask (October 3, 1949 – July 3, 2021) was a Native Hawaiian activist, educator, author, and poet. She served as leader of the Hawaiian sovereignty movement and was professor emeritus at the University of Hawaiʻi at Mānoa. She was a founder of the Kamakakūokalani Center for Hawaiian Studies at the University of Hawaii at Mānoa, and served as its director for almost ten years.

Early life and education 

Haunani-Kay Trask was born on October 3, 1949, to Haunani and Bernard Trask. Trask and her family are descendants of the Piilani line of Maui and the Kahakumakaliua line of Kauai. She was born in San Francisco, California, and grew up on the Koolau side of the island of Oahu in Hawaii.

Trask graduated from Kamehameha Schools in 1967. Trask attended the University of Chicago, but soon transferred to the University of Wisconsin–Madison, where she completed her bachelor's degree in 1972. She earned a master's degree in 1975 and a Ph.D. in political science in 1981, both also from the University of Wisconsin–Madison. Her dissertation was revised into a book, Eros and Power: The Promise of Feminist Theory, published by the University of Pennsylvania Press in 1986.

Career 
Haunani-Kay Trask was a founding member of the Kamakakūokalani Center for Hawaiian Studies at the University of Hawaiʻi at Mānoa. She served as its director for almost ten years, and was one of its first tenured faculty members. During her time at the university, Trask largely helped to secure the building of the Gladys Brandt Kamakakūokalani Center for Hawaiian Studies, which would become the permanent center for Hawaiian Studies at the University of Hawaiʻi at Mānoa. In 2010, Trask retired from her director position but continued to teach about native political movements in Hawaii and the Pacific, the literature and politics of Pacific Islander women, Hawaiian history and politics, and third world and indigenous history and politics as an emeritus faculty member.

Beginning in 1986, Trask hosted and produced First Friday, a monthly public-access television program that highlighted political and cultural Hawaiian issues.  Trask co-wrote and co-produced the award-winning 1993 documentary Act of War: The Overthrow of the Hawaiian Nation. She also authored the 1993 book From a Native Daughter: Colonialism and Sovereignty in Hawaii, which was described by Cynthia G. Franklin and Laura E. Lyons as a "foundational text" about indigenous rights. Trask published two books of poetry, the 1994 Light in the Crevice Never Seen and the 2002 Night Is a Sharkskin Drum. Trask developed We Are Not Happy Natives, a CD published in 2002 about the Hawaiian sovereignty movement.

Trask represented Native Hawaiians at the United Nations Working Group on Indigenous Peoples in Geneva, and in 2001 traveled to South Africa to participate in the United Nations World Conference against Racism, Racial Discrimination, Xenophobia, and Related Intolerance.

In March 2017, Hawaii Magazine recognized Trask as one of the most influential women in Hawaiian history.

In September 2021, the Department of Philosophy at the University of Hawaiʻi at Mānoa issued a posthumous apology to Trask for attacks she received from Mānoa philosophers in the past.

Views 

During her time in Chicago while studying for her undergraduate degree, Trask learned about and became an active supporter of the Black Panther Party. While studying at the University of Wisconsin–Madison, Trask also participated in student protests against the Vietnam War. Because of these experiences, Trask wrote that, as a graduate student at the University of Wisconsin–Madison, she began to develop theories about how capitalism and racism sustained each other. During her time studying politics in her graduate program at the University of Wisconsin-Madison, Trask began to engage in feminist studies, and considered herself to be a feminist.

Later in Trask's work, she denounced her role as a "feminist" because of the mainstream focus on Americans and whiteness, herself being more aligned with transnational feminism. "Now that I was working among my people, I saw there were simply too many limitations in the scope of feminist theory and praxis. The feminism I had studied was just too white, too American. Only issues defined by white women as 'feminist' had structured discussions. Their language revolved around First World 'rights' talk, that Enlightenment individualism that takes for granted 'individual' primacy. Last, but in many ways most troubling, feminist style was aggressively American."

Trask opposed tourism to Hawaii and the U.S. military's presence in Hawaii. In 2004, Trask spoke out against the Akaka Bill, a bill to establish a process for Native Hawaiians to gain federal recognition similar to the recognition that some Native American tribes possess. Trask felt that this bill did not do justice to Native Hawaiian people because it allowed the U.S. government to control Native Hawaiian governing structure, land, and resources without recognizing Hawaii as a nation of its own. Additionally, she clarified that the bill was drafted ex parte and that hearings were withheld in order to exclude native community involvement.

In her obituary, the New York Times noted her pressure for Indigenous sovereignty and quoted her as saying, “We will die as Hawaiians. We will never be Americans.”

Personal life
Trask's longtime partner was University of Hawaii professor David Stannard. Trask died from cancer on July 3, 2021.

Family 
Trask came from a politically active family. Mililani Trask, her younger sister, is a leader of the Hawaiian sovereignty movement. Her paternal grandfather, David Trask Sr., was chairman of the civil service commission and the police commission in 1922, served as the sheriff of Honolulu from 1923 to 1926, and was elected a territorial senator from Oahu in 1932. He was a key proponent of Hawaii statehood. Trask's uncle, Arthur K. Trask, was an attorney, an active member of the Democratic Party, and a member of the Statehood Commission from 1944–1957. David Trask Jr., another uncle, was the head of the Hawaii Government Employees Association.

Selected works

Books 

 Eros and Power: The Promise of Feminist Theory (1986)
 From a Native Daughter: Colonialism and Sovereignty in Hawaii (1993)

Poetry 

 Light in the Crevice Never Seen (1994)
 Night Is a Sharkskin Drum (2002)

Other 

 Act of War: The Overthrow of the Hawaiian Nation (documentary film, 1993)
 Haunani-Kay Trask: We Are Not Happy Natives (educational CD, 2002)

References

External links 
 Brief biographical note
 A 1996 interview with an otherwise unidentified Canadian publication
 Franklin, Cynthia and Laura F. Lyons. "Land, Leadership, and Nation: Haunani-Kay Trask on the Testimonial Uses of Life Writing in Hawaii", Biography, 27: 1, Winter 2004.
 "Trask Still Beats the Drum of Resistance", August 23, 2002, Asianweek.com

1949 births
2021 deaths
Activists from California
American women writers
Hawaiian studies
Kamehameha Schools alumni
Native Hawaiian academics
Native Hawaiian nationalists
Native Hawaiian writers
University of Hawaiʻi faculty
University of Wisconsin–Madison College of Letters and Science alumni
Women in Hawaii politics
Writers from California
Writers from Hawaii
21st-century American women
Hawaiian cultural activists